This is a list of cities and towns in Russia with a population of over 50,000 as of the 2021 census. The figures are for the population within the limits of the city/town proper, not the urban area or metropolitan area.

The list includes Sevastopol and settlements within the Republic of Crimea which are internationally recognized as part of Ukraine and were not subject to the 2010 census. The city of Zelenograd (a part of the federal city of Moscow) and the municipal cities/towns of the federal city of St. Petersburg are also excluded, as they are not enumerated in the 2021 census as stand-alone localities.  Note that the sixteen largest cities have a total population of 35,509,177, or roughly 24.1% of the country's total population.

Cities and towns
Cities in bold symbolize the capital city of its respective federal subject. Three capitals are too small to make the list: Naryan-Mar (pop. 25,795), Magas (pop. 15,279), and Anadyr (pop. 15,079). Pyatigorsk is the administrative centre of North Caucasian Federal District but not of any federal subject.

Gallery

Location of most populous cities in Russia

See also
Demographics of Russia
List of cities and towns in Russia, a complete list of all cities and towns in Russia
List of federal subjects of Russia by population

Notes

References

External links
Russian Cities of over 100,000 population at Citypopulation.de
Cities of Russia as a subject of tourist interest https://tour-planet.com

Russia
Population
Demographics of Russia